Turhan Tezol (9 August 1932 – 27 April 2014) was a Turkish basketball player, who competed in the 1952 Summer Olympics.

Turhan Tezol was born to Mehmet Şükrü, an immigrant from Kavala, (then Ottoman Empire), and his wife Zeliha at Istanbul on August 9, 1932. He had four brothers, Alaettin, Tayyar, Erdoğan and Ayhan, as well as two sisters İnal and Mualla (Kuşçu).

Tezol began his playing career at the local team Modaspor. He enjoyed three times Turkish Basketball League championship title with his club. he left Modaspor, and moved to Izmir joining the basketball side of Altınordu. After retiring from active sports, he served as executive at the Izmir-based clubs Altay, Göztepe and Altınordu. Tezol worked also for the Turkish Basketball Federation.

At the age of 19, he was called up to the Turkey juniors national team. Later, he became member of the Turkey national team, taking part at the 1952 Summer Olympic in Helsinki, Finland, and three times at FIBA EuroBasket in 1955, 1957 and 1959. He capped 71 times in total for the national team, and served also as captain.

He is remembered for his capacity in dribbling technique.

Turhan Tezol suffered from pancreatic cancer, and was treated a long time. He died following surgery on 27 April 2014 Izmir. He was survived by his wife Nesrin (née Gündoğdu), two sons, Erhan and Ersin, and five grandchildren.

References

1932 births
Basketball players from Istanbul
Turkish men's basketball players
Olympic basketball players of Turkey
Basketball players at the 1952 Summer Olympics
Turkish referees and umpires
Basketball executives
Deaths from cancer in Turkey
Deaths from pancreatic cancer
2014 deaths